Parornix alta is a moth of the family Gracillariidae. It can be found in the Utah and California, United States.

The larvae feed on Amelanchier alnifolia by mining the leaves of their host plant. The mine has the form of a tentiform mine on the underside the leaf. The epidermis is loosened and much wrinkled, pale brownish and speckled.

References

Parornix
Moths of North America
Moths described in 1925